Aggregate Films is an American motion picture production company founded by actor Jason Bateman. The company currently has a first-look deal with Netflix to generate film and television projects. It previously had a two-year first-look producing deal with Universal Pictures. Bateman hired Jim Garavente to run the company. In 2015, Bateman brought on Aaron Schmidt as the Co-head of Development.

Films

Documentaries

Television series

References

Film production companies of the United States
Mass media companies established in 2012
Mass media in California